Katri Lylynperä (born 3 January 1994) is a Finnish cross-country skier.

Career
She finished 51st in her World Cup debut on 9 March 2013 in Lahti, Finland on the Freestyle Sprint. Her best individual finish during the World Cup is 21st place on 28 November 2015 in Ruka, Finland in the individual sprint.

Cross-country skiing results
All results are sourced from the International Ski Federation (FIS).

Olympic Games

World Championships

World Cup

Season standings

References

External links

1994 births
Living people
Finnish female cross-country skiers
Cross-country skiers at the 2012 Winter Youth Olympics
Universiade bronze medalists for Finland
Universiade medalists in cross-country skiing
Competitors at the 2019 Winter Universiade
Cross-country skiers at the 2022 Winter Olympics
Olympic cross-country skiers of Finland
Sportspeople from Pirkanmaa
21st-century Finnish women